The Lisong Hot Spring is a hot spring in Haiduan Township, Taitung County, Taiwan.

Geology
The hot spring is located 1,075 meters above sea level. The hot spring came out from the holes of stone slopes forming waterfalls located in a deep river valley.

Transportation
The hot spring is accessible on foot from the Southern Cross-Island Highway. Visitors need to walk through trail down to the valley to reach the place.

See also
 Taiwanese hot springs

References

Hot springs of Taitung County